Vinje is a municipality in Vestfold og Telemark county, Norway. It is located in the traditional district of Vest-Telemark which is part of Øvre Telemark. The administrative centre of the municipality is the village of Åmot. Other villages in the municipality include Arabygdi, Edland, Grunge, Haukeli, Krossen, Møsstrond, Nesland, Øyfjell, Raulandsgrend, and Vinje.

The  municipality is the 14th largest by area out of the 356 municipalities in Norway. Vinje is the 209th most populous municipality in Norway with a population of 3,755.

General information
The parish of Vinje was established as a municipality on 1 January 1838 (see formannskapsdistrikt law). In 1860, the northern district of Vinje (population: 745) and the Øyfjell area of Lårdal (population: 243) were combined to form the new municipality of Rauland. During the 1960s, there were many municipal mergers across Norway due to the work of the Schei Committee. On 1 January 1964, Rauland municipality (population: 1,656) and Vinje municipality (population: 2,565) were merged to form a new, larger Vinje municipality.

Name
The municipality (originally the parish) is named after the old Vinje farm since the first Vinje Church was built there.

Coat of arms
The coat of arms was granted on 16 November 1990. The official blazon is "Azure a billy goat argent". This means the arms have a blue field (background) and the charge is a billy goat. The billy goat has a tincture of argent which means it is colored white most of the time, but if it is made out of metal, then silver is used. The color blue and the goat were chosen based on an old poem written by Aasmund Olavsson Vinje. The poem is called Blåmann which is about a goat named Blåmann. This was also chosen to represent the importance of sheep and goat farming in the mountainous municipality.

Churches
The Church of Norway has four parishes within the municipality of Vinje. It is part of the Øvre Telemark prosti (deanery) in the Diocese of Agder og Telemark.

History
The longstanding local traditions of arts and crafts have been well maintained. Rauland hosts a national academy for arts, crafts, and traditional music. Folk music has always been strong in Vinje. The Myllarguten, Targjei Augundsson lived the last years of his life in Rauland. Vinje has also been home to many rosemåling artists.

Vinje became a site of heavy battles during World War II, at the Battle of Vinjesvingen when Norwegian forces held out for over a month against superior German forces.

Geography

Vinje is situated on both the Hardangervidda plateau and parts of the Setesdalsheiene mountain plateau. Most of the land area of the municipality is quite high in elevation. The European route E134 highway passes through Vinje on its way over the mountain pass to connect Eastern Norway and Western Norway. Vinje sits along the highway about halfway between Oslo (in the east) and Haugesund (on Norway's west coast). Starting at Haukeli, the Norwegian National Road 9 leads up the steep slopes to Hovden and further south down the Setesdal valley to the southern coastal city of Kristiansand.

The mountain ski resort Haukelifjell is also found nearby. The isolated and sparsely populated area is known for its rugged, mountainous terrain that supports a wide variety of outdoor activities, amongst them hiking, mountain biking, snowboarding, skiing, fishing, and canoeing. The Hardangervidda National Park lies partially in western Vinje. The village of Arabygdi lies on the lake Totak in the western part of Rauland. Its famous attraction is the "Urdbøuri", the largest stone scree in Northern Europe, with huge boulders scattered on the floor of the valley.

The rivers Tokke and Vinjeåi both flow through the municipality. The lakes Holmavatnet, Møsvatn, Songavatnet, Totak, and Vinjevatn are all located in Vinje as well. The mountains Fitjanuten, Kistenuten, and Vassdalseggi all lie on the municipal and county border in western Vinje.

Government
All municipalities in Norway, including Vinje, are responsible for primary education (through 10th grade), outpatient health services, senior citizen services, welfare and other social services, zoning, economic development, and municipal roads and utilities. The municipality is governed by a municipal council of elected representatives, which in turn elect a mayor.

Municipal council
The municipal council  of Vinje is made up of 25 representatives that are elected to four year terms. The party breakdown of the municipal council is as follows:

Mayor
The mayors of Vinje (incomplete list):
1960–1971: Aslak Versto (Ap)
1976–1979: Ingvald Godal (Sp)
1980–1987: Aslak Versto (Ap)
1988-1995: Olav Nystog (Ap)
1995-1999: Olav Nordstoga (Sp)
1999–2003: Børre Rønningen (Ap)
2003–2015: Arne Vinje (SV)
2015-2023: Jon Rikard Kleven (Sp)

Notable people

The Arts 

 Sveinung Svalastoga (1772 in Rauland – 1809), a Norwegian rose painter, poet and woodcarver
 Myllarguten (Torgeir Agundson Øygarden) (1801–1872), a folk musician and master fiddler
 Aasmund Olavsson Vinje (1818–1870), a poet and journalist, used Nynorsk
 Rikard Berge (1881 in Rauland – 1969), a folklorist, museologist, biographer and editor
 Tarjei Vesaas (1897–1970), a Norwegian poet and novelist
 Aslaug Vaa (1889 in Rauland – 1965), a Norwegian poet and playwright
 Aslak Brekke (1901–1978), a vocalist using stev and a folk singer
 Dyre Vaa (1903–1980), a sculptor and painter, his works are found in Oslo and Vinje
 Anne Lofthus (1932–2003), a Norwegian ceramic artist and art teacher
 Guri Vesaas (born 1939), a Norwegian writer and translator of children's books
 Stein Versto (born 1957), a Norwegian poet, novelist, translator and folk musician
 Aasmund Nordstoga (born 1964), a Norwegian musician, singer, composer and TV presenter
 Sven Erik Kristiansen (born 1969), a musician, former vocalist in the black metal band Mayhem 
 Arve Moen Bergset (born 1972), a traditional folk singer, hardanger fiddler and classical violinist
 Odd Nordstoga (born 1972), a folk singer, musician, actor and editor 
 Ingebjørg Bratland (born 1990), a Norwegian folk singer, kveder and artist

Public Service 

 Paul Peterson Paus (1625-1682), a Norwegian cleric, political activist and poet
 Olav Aslakson Versto (1892 in Rauland – 1977), politician
 Einar Skinnarland (1918–2002), a Norwegian resistance fighter during WWII and dam builder
 Aslak Versto (1924-1992), a politician
 Olav Vesaas (born 1935), a Norwegian journalist, biographer and publisher
 Olav Versto (1950–2011), a Norwegian journalist and editor
 Astrid Versto (born 1953), a Norwegian journalist and diplomat

Sport 
 Olav Jenssen (born 1962), a discus thrower, competed in the 1992 Summer Olympics 
 Knut Tore Apeland (born 1968), a former Nordic combined skier, twice team silver medallist at the 1992 & 1994 Winter Olympics
 Terje Håkonsen (born 1974), a snowboarder

Attractions
The home of Myllarguten is now a small museum.  (The cotters place Kosi in Arabygdi.)
The monument of Myllarguten, the 19th century musician, who played for kings and who inspired Edvard Grieg . It is located on the roadside vis-a-vis Kosi.

References

External links

Municipal fact sheet from Statistics Norway 

 
Municipalities of Vestfold og Telemark
1838 establishments in Norway